The Group Stage was played in 6 rounds from August to October 2009.

Tie-breaking criteria 

The tie breaking procedures follow the same rules as the 2008–09 Champions League. If two teams are tied on points, the following tie-breaking criteria shall be applied, in order, to determine the ranking of teams:

 Greater number of points earned in matches between the teams concerned
 Greater goal difference in matches between the teams concerned
 Greater number of goals scored away from home in matches between the teams concerned
 Reapply first three criteria if two or more teams are still tied
 Greater goal  difference in all group matches
 Greater number of goals scored in group matches
 Greater number of goals scored away in all group matches
 Drawing of lots

Groups 
All times EDT (UTC-4)

Group A

Group B

Group C

Group D

References 

Group Stage